Pattantyús is a Hungarian surname that may refer to
Ádám Pattantyús (born 1978), Hungarian table tennis player
Dezső Pattantyús-Ábrahám (1875–1973), Hungarian politician
Ernő Pattantyús-Ábrahám (1882–1945), Hungarian journalist and writer, brother of Dezső

Hungarian-language surnames